Gamasellus acutus is a species of mite in the family Ologamasidae.

References

acutus
Articles created by Qbugbot
Animals described in 1997